DTE Energy Headquarters is a class-A office complex at I-75 and Grand River on the west side of Downtown Detroit, Michigan. It consists of three buildings: Walker-Cisler Building, General Office Building, and the  Service Building.

Detroit Campus
The Walker-Cisler Building is the large, dark brown skyscraper in the complex. The lighted signs at the top of the building display "DTE". It is built in the International style of architecture. It is composed of steel, with many glass windows. It bears an architectural resemblance to the nearby Executive Plaza Building. In 2007, DTE announced a transformation of the area around its downtown headquarters into landscaped areas with a reflecting pool and walkway adjacent to the MGM Grand Detroit.

The General Office Building is located at 2000 Second Ave. between Elizabeth St. and Beech St. It was constructed in 1921 and stands at eleven stories in height. The building, designed in the renaissance revival architectural style, is used primarily for offices.

The Service Building is a lowrise building that stands at 6 floors in height, and was completed in 1938. It stands on Third Ave. between Elizabeth St. and Beech St.

The ESOC (Electrical Systems Operations Center) Building is a three-story building. Construction of the ESOC Building started in 2017, and was completed in 2021. It stands at the south-east corner of Third Ave and Plum St.

Walker-Cisler Building, General Office Building and Service Building are connected with one another by a covered cafeteria and meeting space in the middle of these three buildings, on the second floor level. The Service Building and the ESOC Building are connected to the MGM Grand Casino Parking structure at the second floor level via a covered walkway. DTE shares use of the parking structure along with casino guests.

Gallery

See also

Walker Lee Cisler 
List of tallest buildings in Detroit

References

Further reading

Detroit Edison Synchroscope Magazine, January 1978 edition.

External links

Skyscraper office buildings in Detroit
Downtown Detroit
DTE Energy